Lucas is an unincorporated community in Henry County, in the U.S. state of Missouri.

History
A post office called Lucas was established in 1852, and remained in operation until 1901. The community bears the name of a local merchant.

References

Unincorporated communities in Henry County, Missouri
Unincorporated communities in Missouri